

General information
Sri Sarada Institute of Science and Technology (SSIST) is a technical institute located in Anantharam, in the suburbs of Hyderabad. It is affiliated to Jawaharlal Nehru Technological University, Hyderabad. It is one of four Sri Sarada institutions which are governed by the Sri Sarada Vidya Peetham Educational Society.

Motto

Sri Sarada's motto is Building Knowledge Society.

Programs
Undergraduate Programs

 Bachelor of Technology in Computer Science and Engineering (CSE)
 Bachelor of Technology in Electronics and Communications Engineering (ECE)
 Bachelor of Technology Electrical and Electronics Engineering (EEE)
 Bachelor of Technology degree in Civil Engineering (CIVIL)
 Bachelor of Technology degree in Mechanical Engineering (MECH)
 Bachelor of Pharmacy (B. Pharma)

Graduate Programs

 Master of Business Administration
 M TECH 
 VLSI&EMBEDDED SYS
 CSE
 SE

Admissions

Admission to the B. Tech, B. Pharma and MBA  programs is through the EAMCET/ICET, a state entrance exam conducted by the government of Telangana.

Campus

The Sri Sarada campus occupies 17 acres in the suburbs of Hyderabad near National Highway 202. It has a volleyball court, basketball court, tennis court, badminton court and a cricket ground.

References

External links
Official website
Official website

All India Council for Technical Education
Engineering colleges in Hyderabad, India
2006 establishments in Andhra Pradesh
Educational institutions established in 2006